Rineloricaria felipponei is a species of catfish in the family Loricariidae. It is native to South America, where it occurs in the lower Río de la Plata basin in Argentina and Uruguay. The species reaches 11.3 cm (4.4 inches) in length and is believed to be a facultative air-breather.

References 

Loricariini
Catfish of South America
Fish described in 1943
Taxa named by Henry Weed Fowler
Fish of Argentina
Fish of Uruguay